Čejvan is a surname. Notable people with the surname include:

 Adem Čejvan (1927–1989), Bosnian actor
 Jan Čejvan (born 1976), Slovenian figure skater

Bosnian surnames